In the 2008–09 EHF Cup season, VfL Gummersbach won the Europe's club handball tournament.

Round 1

|}

* Cancelled because 2008 South Ossetia war

Round 2

|}

Round 3

|}

Round of 16

 

|}

Quarter-finals
The first legs were played on 28–29 March and the second legs were played on 4–5 April.

|}

Semi-finals
The first legs were played on 25 April and the second legs on 1–3 May.

|}

Final

|}

External links
www.eurohandball.com/ec/ehf 

EHF Cup seasons
EHF Cup
EHF Cup